is a Japanese manga series written and illustrated by Kyūri Yamada. It was serialized in Akita Shoten's shōnen manga magazine Weekly Shōnen Champion from November 2015 to August 2017, with its chapters collected into eight tankōbon volumes. A sequel manga, AI no Idenshi: Red Queen, was serialized in Bessatsu Shōnen Champion from October 2017 to June 2019, and has been collected into five volumes. A third series, AI no Idenshi: Blue Age, has been serialized in Bessatsu Shōnen Champion since July 2020, and has been collected into five volumes as of December 2022. An anime television series adaptation by Madhouse is set to premiere in July 2023.

Characters

Media

Manga
It has been collected into eight tankōbon volumes, published from April 2016 to November 2017. A sequel manga, titled , was serialized in Bessatsu Shōnen Champion from October 12, 2017, to June 12, 2019. Five tankōbon volumes have been published from April 2018 to August 2019. A third series, titled , began serialization in Bessatsu Shōnen Champion on July 10, 2020. As of December 2022, five tankōbon volumes have been released.

Volume list

AI no Idenshi: Red Queen

AI no Idenshi: Blue Age

Anime
An anime television series adaptation was announced on December 8, 2022. It is produced by Madhouse and directed by Yuzo Sato, with scripts written by Ryunosuke Kingetsu, character designs handled by Kei Tsuchiya, who also serves as chief animation director, and music composed by Takashi Ohmama and Natsumi Tabuchi. The series is set to premiere in July 2023.

Reception
AI no Idenshi was ranked 14th in the 2017 edition of Takarajimasha's Kono Manga ga Sugoi! list of top manga for male readers. In 2018, the series won the Excellence Award in the manga division of the 21st Japan Media Arts Festival Awards.

References

External links
  
  
  
  
 

Akita Shoten manga
Anime series based on manga
Madhouse (company)
Nikkatsu
Science fiction anime and manga
Shōnen manga
Upcoming anime television series